The 1897 Vermont Green and Gold football team was an American football team that represented  the University of Vermont as an independent during the 1897 college football season. In their first year under head coach William Farrar, the team compiled a 3–0–2 record.

Schedule

References

Vermont
Vermont Catamounts football seasons
College football undefeated seasons
Vermont Green and Gold football